Biston pustulata is a moth of the family Geometridae first described by William Warren in 1896. It is found in Hainan in China, southern Thailand, Peninsular Malaysia and Sundaland.

The larvae have been recorded feeding on Acacia mangium and Gliricidia species. They are robust and coarsely mottled pale green (although more bluish grey green in earlier instars). The head is rugose (wrinkled), dull rufous orange, marked centrally with a darker brown, inverted "V".

References

Moths described in 1896
Bistonini